Barbara Colby (July 2, 1939 – July 24, 1975) was an American actress. She appeared in episodes of numerous television series before a 1974 appearance on The Mary Tyler Moore Show led to a main cast role on the new series Phyllis; after filming three episodes, she and a colleague were murdered outside an acting class, in an unsolved shooting.

Life
 
Born in New York City on July 2, 1939, Colby was predominantly raised in New Orleans, where she had interest in acting while attending high school. After graduating, she received a scholarship to Bard College in Annandale-On-Hudson, New York, followed by a semester at the Paris-Sorbonne University in France.

Colby started her acting career in the theater. Following a performance in Six Characters in Search of an Author in 1964, she moved to Broadway with a debut in The Devils the following year. Throughout the rest of the decade, she appeared in such plays as Under Milk Wood, Murder in the Cathedral, Dear Liar and A Doll's House and garnered fine reviews for her Portia in Julius Caesar in 1966.

Her first important television role was in the first season of Columbo in an episode titled "Murder by the Book" in 1971. She played many support/guest roles on such established shows as The Odd Couple, McMillan & Wife, The F.B.I., Medical Center, Kung Fu and Gunsmoke.

Colby was a leading actor in the American Conservatory Theater in San Francisco for two years. She appeared in 1970s plays such as Aubrey Beardsley the Neophyte, House of Blue Leaves, Afternoon Tea and The Hot l Baltimore. She returned to the classics with an off-Broadway role as Elizabeth in Richard III and was back on Broadway with the plays Murderous Angels in 1971 and a revival of A Doll's House in 1975.

In 1974, Colby appeared in two films, California Split and Memory of Us. In 1975, she co-starred in Rafferty and the Gold Dust Twins.

A role as a streetwise prostitute in an episode of The Mary Tyler Moore Show led to an appearance in a subsequent episode. In 1975, Colby appeared as a new regular player on the Mary Tyler Moore Show spin-off Phyllis, starring Cloris Leachman. Colby, who had appeared with Leachman in the TV movie A Brand New Life in 1973, was cast as Leachman's boss, Julie Erskine, the owner of a commercial photography studio.

Personal life
Colby was married to Robert Levitt Jr., whose mother was Ethel Merman. The couple was separated at the time of Colby's death.

Death 
On July 24, 1975, Colby and acting colleague James Kiernan were walking to their car following an acting class in Palms, Los Angeles, California, when they were shot inside a parking area. The murders occurred sometime after the first three episodes of the upcoming TV series Phyllis had been filmed. 

Colby was killed instantly, but Kiernan was able to describe the shooting to police before he died of his wounds. Kiernan said that he did not recognize the two men who shot them and that the shooting had occurred without warning or provocation. It was normal for Colby and classmates to congregate in the parking lot after acting class and talk. They were approached by two black men in a light-colored van and were each shot once. 

Police said there was no attempt to rob the pair and concluded it was a random drive-by shooting or a targeted killing. The killers were never identified and the case remained an open cold case. 

At the time of her death, Colby was separated from her husband, Bob Levitt, son of Ethel Merman. While the first three episodes of the first season of Phyllis were her final works, all released in the September 1975, her final appearance to be released was in the TV movie The Ashes of Mrs. Reasoner, aired in January 1976. Colby's immediate survivors included her mother and half-sister.

Filmography

See also 
List of unsolved murders

References

External links 

 
 

1939 births
1975 deaths
1975 murders in the United States
20th-century American actresses
Actresses from New York City
American film actresses
American stage actresses
American television actresses
Deaths by firearm in California
People murdered in Los Angeles
Unsolved murders in the United States